Masih Saighani (Dari: مسیح سیغانی; born 22 September 1986) is an Afghan footballer who plays as a defender for German club Türk Gücü Friedberg in Hessenliga.

Club career

Aizawl 
On 26 August 2017, Saighani signed for the I-League Champions, Aizawl F.C. This was his first football experience outside Germany where he had been playing since 2004. Masih made his debut for Aizawl in the Mizoram Premier League versus Mizoram Police FC. His I-League debut came vs. East Bengal F.C. in a 2–2 draw. In the following game vs. Churchill Brothers S.C., he was adjudged the Man of the Match for his solid display in defense & playmaking attributes after Aizawl F.C. beat Churchill Brothers S.C. 1–0.

Masih made his continental debut for Aizawl F.C. vs. Zob Ahan Esfahan F.C. in the AFC Champions League Qualifiers. The I-League Champions were beaten down 3–1 but Masih & his club's performance received appreciation from the critics. He opened his account in the top tier of Indian Football vs. Indian Arrows in a 2–2 draw.

Saighani finished his debut season in Indian Football with Runners' Up spot in the Mizoram Premier League, Fifth place finish in the I-League & a Quarter Final participation in the Super Cup. He rose to spotlight in the inaugural season.

Real Kashmir 
In September 2021, Saighani signed with another I-League club Real Kashmir.

Personal life 
Masih Saighani is a Muslim and belongs to Tajik ethnic group. He was born on 22 September 1986 in Kabul, originally from Saighan, Bamyan.

International goals

Club statistics

References

External links 
 profile at Espn FC

1986 births
Footballers from Kabul
Hazara sportspeople
Living people
German footballers
German people of Afghan descent
Afghan footballers
Afghanistan international footballers
Association football central defenders
Association football midfielders
VfB Marburg players
Bonner SC players
Sportfreunde Siegen players
TSV Steinbach Haiger players
TSV Eintracht Stadtallendorf players
Aizawl FC players
Abahani Limited (Dhaka) players
Oberliga (football) players
Hessenliga players
Regionalliga players
I-League players
Bangladesh Premier League players
Indian Super League players
Afghan expatriate footballers
Expatriate footballers in India
Afghan expatriate sportspeople in India
Expatriate footballers in Bangladesh
Afghan expatriate sportspeople in Bangladesh